Halerpestes is a genus of flowering plants belonging to the family Ranunculaceae.

Its native range is Europe, Tropical Asia, South America, North America and Temperate Asia.

Species:

Halerpestes cymbalaria 
Halerpestes exilis 
Halerpestes filisecta 
Halerpestes kawakamii 
Halerpestes lancifolia 
Halerpestes ruthenica 
Halerpestes sarmentosa 
Halerpestes tricuspis 
Halerpestes uniflora

References

Ranunculaceae
Ranunculaceae genera